The 2018 Asia Cup Qualifier was a cricket tournament that was held in Malaysia from 29 August to 6 September 2018. The event served as the qualifier for the 2018 Asia Cup. The top two teams from the group stage met in the final, with the winner progressing to the 2018 Asia Cup. The fixture between the United Arab Emirates and Nepal on 30 August 2018 was a One Day International (ODI) match. It was the first time both sides had played each other in an ODI match, with the UAE going on to win the fixture by 78 runs.

The United Arab Emirates finished top of the group stage with eight points. They were joined in the final by Hong Kong, who finished second with seven points, and a better net run rate than Oman, who also finished with seven points. Hong Kong won the final, beating the UAE by two wickets, to qualify for the 2018 Asia Cup. Hong Kong's captain, Anshuman Rath, said afterwards that "all the hard work that has gone in this tournament over the last couple of months really has paid off".

Squads
The following teams and squads were selected to take part:

Prior to the tournament, Anshuman Rath replaced Babar Hayat as captain of Hong Kong. Jhathavedh Subramanyan was ruled out of Hong Kong's squad with injury, and was replaced by Aftab Hussain.

Points table

Fixtures

Round 1

Round 2

Round 3

Round 4

Round 5

Final

References

External links
 Series home at ESPN Cricinfo

Asia Cup
International cricket competitions in Malaysia
2018 in Malaysian sport
International cricket competitions in 2018–19
ACC Asia Cup Qualifier